Diomus roseicollis is a species of lady beetle in the family Coccinellidae. It is found in North America.

References

Further reading

 

Coccinellidae
Beetles of North America
Beetles described in 1853
Taxa named by Étienne Mulsant
Articles created by Qbugbot